The name Kay is found both as a surname (see Kay (surname)) and as a given name. In English-speaking countries, it is usually a feminine name, often a short form of Katherine or one of its variants; but it is also used as a first name in its own right, and also as a masculine name (for example in India, the Netherlands, and Sweden). The alternative spelling of Kaye is encountered as a surname, but also occasionally as a given name: for instance, actress Kaye Ballard.

Name

Female
 Kay Armen (1915–2011), stage name of Armenuhi Manoogian, American Armenian singer
 Kay Bailey Hutchison (born 1943), American lawyer, politician, and diplomat
 Kay Burley (born 1960), Sky News founder and presenter
 Kay Copland, Scottish sport shooter
 Kay Elson (born 1947), Australian politician
 Kay Francis (1905–1968), American actress
 Kay Hagan (1953–2019), American politician 
 Kay Hull (born 1954), Australian politician
 Kay Kendall (1927–1959), British actress and comedian
 Kay Kinsman (1909–1998), Canadian artist and writer
 Kay Lahusen (1930–2021), American photographer, writer and gay rights activist
Kay Matheson (1928-2013), teacher, Gaelic scholar, one of four students involved in the 1950 removal of the Stone of Scone.
 Kay Mazzo (born 1946), American ballet dancer and educator
 Kay A. Orr (1939), 36th governor of Nebraska, US
 Kay Toinette K. T. Oslin (1942–2020), American country music singer-songwriter
 Kay Panabaker (born 1990), American actress
 Kay Parker (born 1944), English pornographic actress
 Kay Purcell (1963–2020), English actress
 Kay Redfield Jamison (born 1946), American psychologist and writer
 Kay Starr (1922–2016), stage name of Katherine Starks, American pop and jazz singer
 Kay Thompson (1909–1998), American author
 Kay Tse (born 1977), Hong Kong Cantopop singer
 Kay (singer) (born 1985), Canadian singer-songwriter

Male
 Kay Bell, American football player and professional wrestler
 Kay Christofferson, American politician
 Kay van Dijk, Dutch volleyball player
 Kay Kyser,  American bandleader and radio personality
 Kay Nielsen, Danish illustrator
 Kay Pollak, Swedish film director
 Kay Stephenson, American football player and coach
 Prince Kay One, German singer and rapper

Fictional characters
 Agent K, a character in the Men In Black film series and animated series
 Kay Adams-Corleone, a character in Mario Puzo's novel The Godfather.
 Sir Kay, character from Arthurian legend
 Kay Harker, character from the book The Box of Delights by John Masefield.
 Kay, a protagonist in the video game Legend of Kay.
 Kay, also spelled Kai, a character in Hans Christian Andersen's fairy tale The Snow Queen
 Kay, a character in the Vertigo comic series Fables, based on the above.
 Kay Faraday, a character in Ace Attorney Investigations: Miles Edgeworth
 Kay Engel, a character in Freier Fall (2013 film).
 Kay, protagonist from the video game Sea of Solitude

See also
 K, the eleventh letter in the Latin alphabet
 Kai
 Hurricane Kay (disambiguation)
 Kay (surname)
 Kay Musical Instrument Company, a US musical instrument manufacturer
 Kaye (disambiguation)
Kaya (disambiguation)
Kaylee

English feminine given names
English masculine given names
English unisex given names